Tower Grove East is a neighborhood of St. Louis, Missouri. The Tower Grove East neighborhood is bordered by Shenandoah Avenue to the north, Nebraska Avenue to the east, Gravois Avenue to the south, and south Grand Boulevard to the west.

The neighborhood is so named because it partially borders (across Grand Boulevard) the east entrance of Tower Grove Park. The land of Tower Grove Park was deeded to the city in 1868 as a gift by Henry Shaw, the owner of much of the surrounding land including what is now the Missouri Botanical Gardens. The park also lends its name to the near neighborhood of Tower Grove South. Tower Grove Park lends much culture and activity to the neighborhood, with its annual festivals, farmers markets, and activities.

The neighborhood also includes many businesses on South Grand Avenue, a popular area of restaurants, nightlife, and shopping. Within the neighborhood itself are many charming restaurants, a thriving community garden, churches, schools, and the Stray Dog Theatre.

Tower Grove Park was originally part of La Petite Prairie, which was settled by the French in the early 18th century. Grazing land was held in common, and farming land was divided into long narrow tracts. The commons system was abandoned around 1800, and the land began to be sold into private hands. By the 1850s much of the property was owned by German Catholics, recent immigrants from Germany's 1848 civil war. The German dairy farmers found it ideal as pasture land. They built comfortable homes and began creating a community toward the end of the 19th century. Blocks were developed, upon which many of the prosperous German immigrants, turned American citizens, built grand homes.

The owners and builders in the early days of Tower Grove East were for the most part siblings, cousins and extended family members of the prominent German Americans living in Compton Heights. Thus architectural trends originating in Compton Heights and Flora Place influenced the designs of homes on South Compton, Shenandoah and several of the other residential avenues. Like Tower Grove Heights, these residences were built on the four-square plan. The typical house is a pyramid or hipped roof on a two-story cube. Often, a pressed brick or limestone course separates the stories. The original developers then varied the theme through detail choices. Attention was heavily focused on the entry, cornice and windows. Buyers would often choose the architectural elements from pattern books that illustrated multiple styles of windows, doors, stairways and fireplace mantels. Thus the interiors of the homes in Tower Grove East are full of surprises. The often austere exterior facades typically hide a wealth of richly designed entries with carved fretwork; built-in hall benches, mirrors and bookcases; wood paneling; stained-glass windows and elaborate staircases.

Demographics
In 2020 Tower Grove East's racial makeup was 55.6% White, 28.9% Black,  5.0% Asian, 5.3% Latino or Hispanic, 8.2% Mixed Race, and 0.1% Native American.

Education

 source

 Fanning Middle School
 McKinley Classical Junior Academy
 Eagle College  Prep
 Roosevelt High School
 Shenandoah Elementary School
 South City Open Studio and Gallery for Children

See also
Compton Hill Reservoir Park, the park and city water reservoir nearby, that houses a monument from the local German American community to a local German language newspaper The Westliche Post, which was later merged by Joseph Pulitzer to form the Post-Dispatch

References

External links 
  Tower Grove East neighborhood website
 South Grand Community Improvement District South Grand business district information
 Grand South Grand South Grand business district information

Neighborhoods in St. Louis